"Aerodynamic" is an instrumental track by Daft Punk, featuring a prominent guitar solo. The track was released on 28 March 2001 as the second single from the Discovery album. "Aerodynamic" hit the U.S. dance charts through club play as the B-side to "Digital Love".

Composition
Guy-Manuel de Homem-Christo once described the Discovery album as "A mix between the past and the future, maybe the present." Thomas Bangalter also elaborated in a 2001 interview that "A lot of house music today just uses samples from disco records of the '70s and '80s... While we might have some disco influences, we decided to go further and bring in all the elements of music that we liked as children, whether it's disco, electro, heavy metal, rock, or classical."

This is reflected in the structure of "Aerodynamic", which is said to build up a funk groove, halt for a solo consisting of "metallic, two-hand tapping on electric guitar", combining the two styles, and ending with a separate "spacier" electronic segment. The solo elements were described playfully as "impossible, ridiculous Yngwie guitar arpeggios", which reflect the fast arpeggiation common with violin parts in classical music. Bangalter acknowledged that "Some people might think that the guitar solos on 'Aerodynamic' are in bad taste, but for us, it's all about being true to ourselves and not caring what other people would think. We really tried to include most of the things we liked as kids, and bring that sense of fun to it." He also commented that the end of the track "is completely baroque music, a classical composition we put into synthetic form."

The "Aerodynamic" single contained a B-side remix titled "Aerodynamite". Another remix of "Aerodynamic" features Detroit-based hip-hop group Slum Village. The creation of the Slum Village remix resulted after Slum Village used an uncredited sample of Bangalter's "Extra Dry" in their song "Raise It Up". Instead of asking for compensation for using the sample, Pedro Winter suggested to Daft Punk that they ask Slum Village to remix one of their tracks.

Both "Aerodynamite" and the Slum Village remix were later included on the album Daft Club. The album also contains a longer remix of "Aerodynamic", featuring elements of "One More Time". A live version coupled with "One More Time" is featured on the album Alive 2007.

Music video
The video was released in 2001 and contained scenes that would later form the 2003 anime film Interstella 5555. It shows an army of humanoid troopers sedating the audience with gas, and poisoning and kidnapping the alien band members from the "One More Time" video. The guitarist (later revealed to be named Arpegius) escapes and runs away from the troopers, but one of the troopers shoots him with a tranquilizer dart. The troopers gather the members in pods, and the pods get beamed up to a vessel. The audience wakes up confused and then the vessel flies away.

Legacy
The song was used in the French film L'Auberge espagnole. "Aerodynamic" was also performed by Myleene Klass on piano for a Pantene commercial. and was featured in several episodes of MTV programs Pimp my Ride, Date My Mom, Quiero mis quinces and Next.

"Aerodynamic" was sampled for the Wiley song "Summertime" from his 2008 album See Clear Now. Nicky Romero released a remix of "Aerodynamic" in 2011. The song was also remixed for the 2012 video game Kinect Star Wars.

Track listing

Charts

Notes

References

External links

 Official Daft Punk website
 Official German website
 Virgin Records Daft Punk official website

2001 singles
2001 songs
Animated music videos
Baroque pop songs
Daft Punk songs
Electronic rock songs
Pop instrumentals
Rock instrumentals
Songs written by Guy-Manuel de Homem-Christo
Songs written by Thomas Bangalter
Virgin Records singles